Mordellistena arida is a beetle in the genus Mordellistena of the family Mordellidae. It is more commonly known as the Tumbling Flower Beetle. It was described in 1862 by John Lawrence LeConte.

References

arida
Beetles described in 1862